Green Schools Bara (“Sekoly Maitso Bara”) is a sub-project of the Integrated Rural Development Project (IRDP) in the Bara-Region (SoFaBa-FLM) and works in Fiherena Toliara Synod (SPFT) and Ihorombe (SPH) of the Malagasy Lutheran Church in the central south and south-west of Madagascar.

History

SoFaBa started with its educational in 1998, and the development of “Green Schools” was part of the programme. The main focus was, however, given to encouraging the parents in the Bara-region to send their children to school and to build school houses in cooperation with the local community.

In 2003 there started a new period in SoFaBa’s educational work with a strong focus on the pedagogical work and on the general improvement of the quality of the existing schools. This includes a serious attempt to develop and introduce a Green Programme. The school in Ambatolahy in the Ankazoabo region became the first green pilot school. 

A new level was reached in 2005/2006 when a compulsory and holistic “Green School Programme” with many different components was introduced in all schools. By this way, the educational work in the Bara-region started by SoFaBa was strengthened and qualitatively improved. The Green Schools Bara continue and improve the work started within the SoFaBa-project putting a special emphasis on modern pedagogy, methodical renewal and social issues  like the promotion of girls and children with disabilities. Furthermore, the Green Schools Bara cooperates with the government for reaching Education for All - one of the Millennium Development Goals

Objectives

Green Education is an integrated education that includes all subjects. The heart of the matter is an education about the interplay of all life, the sustainable use of natural resources and the respect for and love to all creation. This requires “integrated teaching” that makes the interdependence between the single human being, the community and the surrounding ecological system obvious.

Activities

Green Schools Bara works in remote and low developed areas in the central south-west of Madagascar. There are few or no other development organizations in this area, the state is poorly represented and many children have no possibility to go to school. The project supports the objectives of the Malagasy government to ensure a basic education of high quality for all children by 2015.

The project's main activities are:
 Construction of village schools
 Renovation and improvement of existing school
 Improvement of teaching
 Teacher’s training
 Financial support to schools and teachers
 Support with equipment

In 2006, Green School Bara started with the elaboration and production of school books and pedagogical material. This resulted in a cooperation with the National Reading Centre at the University of Stavanger, Norway, and, in 2007, the creation of an independent publishing company, Vakoka Vakiteny.

Schools

The following schools are included in the project:
 Fiherena Toliara Synod (Atsimo Andrefana Region)
 Ambatolahy
 Andaka
 Angavo
 Mahabo
 Mahazoarivo
 Marosakoa
 Mitsinjo Soatanimbary
 Tamotamo
 Ihorombe Synod (Ihorombe Region)
 Ankasy
 Besakoa Anenjika
 Tsingilofilobe

Funding
Green Schools Bara is a project included in the Green Education Programme ProVert that is granted by the Norwegian Government (Norad) during the period 2007 - 2011. The financial support from ProVert will diminish gradually; at the same time the local shares will increase for ensuring the sustainability of the work. There will also be worked actively for finding individual partners supporting the single schools in these low developed and vulnerable area.

External links
 Vakoka Vakiteny official website

Education in Madagascar